Gábor Nagy (born 16 October 1985) is a Hungarian international football player who currently plays for Zalaegerszegi TE.

References 
Hivatasos Labdarugok Szervezete
Gábor Nagy at Soccerway

1985 births
Living people
Sportspeople from Szombathely
Hungarian footballers
Hungary international footballers
Association football midfielders
MTK Budapest FC players
Szombathelyi Haladás footballers
Újpest FC players
Nemzeti Bajnokság I players
Nemzeti Bajnokság II players